Felix Belano (born December 24, 1976 in Tagum City, Davao del Norte), is a Filipino retired professional basketball player in the Philippine Basketball Association and the former head coach of the UV Green Lancers.

Playing career

Belano started his professional basketball career with the Davao Eagles in the Metropolitan Basketball Association.

On August 14, 1999, he earned the distinction as the first player to record a quadruple-double in the annals of Philippine basketball during a game against Willie Miller-led Nueva Ecija Patriots, when he tallied 17 points, 11 rebounds, 11 assists and 10 steals. With this feat, he changed his jersey number from 9 to 42. He was named the rookie of the year in the 1999 season. It would be the only such quadruple-double until Kyt Jimenez of the Sarangani Marlins did it in the Maharlika Pilipinas Basketball League during the 2022 season.

He was drafted 14th overall by Pop Cola in the 1999 PBA Draft but did not play a single game with the franchise. In 2001, he signed with Sta. Lucia Realtors as a free agent. In May 2002, he was traded to Talk 'N Text for Gherome Ejercito.

His stint with the Talk 'N Text would be the most remarkable in his career. During Game 7 of the 2007 PBA Fiesta Conference Finals against the Alaska Aces, he had a shot that would have forced an overtime. At the end of the season 2009, he was left unsigned. Before the start of the 2010 season, he was signed by the Barako Bull Energy Boosters. Then, before the Fiesta Conference, he was acquired by the Sta. Lucia Realtors and played with the team until it disbanded.

After Sta. Lucia's disbandment and eventual sale to Meralco, with no team to sign up with, he decided to retire.

Coaching career

Belano served as the head coach of his alma mater, the University of the Visayas Green Lancers in the CESAFI. He helped the Green Lancers win the title against the SWU Cobras in 2013 after being down 0–2 of their best-of-five series. After losing to the USC Warriors during the final four, he was fired at the end of the 2014 CESAFI season.

Belano has pioneered the Outstanding Basketball Enhancement for the Youth, otherwise known as OBEY, which offers PBA-based basketball training to private institutions in Cebu, trailblazing basketball sport as a career path of choice for the new generation of K-12 learners.

Personal life
He is married to Liza May Viajante, a pediatrician, with whom he has four children, Patrick Yuan Emmanuel, Andrei Siegdon Nathanael, Damian Felix Zuriel, and Marquita Dawn Felicia. They now reside in Cebu City.

References

1976 births
Filipino men's basketball players
Living people
TNT Tropang Giga players
People from Tagum
Basketball players from Davao del Norte
Sta. Lucia Realtors players
Barako Bull Energy Boosters players
Filipino men's basketball coaches
UV Green Lancers basketball players
Pop Cola Panthers draft picks